Kandijan (also Romanized as Kandījān; also known as Kandenjān and Kangān Jān) is a village in Posht Par Rural District, Simakan District, Jahrom County, Fars Province, Iran. At the 2006 census, its population was 264, in 57 families.

References 

Populated places in Jahrom County